The 1971–72 Milwaukee Bucks season was the fourth season in franchise history. Led by Kareem Abdul-Jabbar, the Bucks finished in first place in the Midwest Division. Abdul-Jabbar won the NBA Most Valuable Player Award ahead of Jerry West and Wilt Chamberlain of the Los Angeles Lakers. On January 9, 1972, the Bucks snapped the Los Angeles Lakers' 33-game winning streak.

Draft picks

Roster

Regular season
 January 9: The Bucks ended the Los Angeles Lakers' 33-game winning streak.

Season standings

z – clinched division title
y – clinched division title
x – clinched playoff spot

Record vs. opponents

Game log

Playoffs

|- align="center" bgcolor="#ffcccc"
| 1
| March 28
| Golden State
| L 106–117
| Kareem Abdul-Jabbar (28)
| Kareem Abdul-Jabbar (15)
| Lucius Allen (8)
| Milwaukee Arena9,877
| 0–1
|- align="center" bgcolor="#ccffcc"
| 2
| March 30
| Golden State
| W 118–93
| Kareem Abdul-Jabbar (25)
| Kareem Abdul-Jabbar (22)
| Oscar Robertson (9)
| Milwaukee Arena10,746
| 1–1
|- align="center" bgcolor="#ccffcc"
| 3
| April 1
| @ Golden State
| W 122–94
| Abdul-Jabbar, Dandridge (23)
| Kareem Abdul-Jabbar (16)
| Oscar Robertson (14)
| Oakland–Alameda County Coliseum Arena13,502
| 2–1
|- align="center" bgcolor="#ccffcc"
| 4
| April 4
| @ Golden State
| W 106–99
| Bob Dandridge (31)
| Kareem Abdul-Jabbar (20)
| Oscar Robertson (11)
| Oakland–Alameda County Coliseum Arena12,986
| 3–1
|- align="center" bgcolor="#ccffcc"
| 5
| April 6
| Golden State
| W 108–100
| Bob Dandridge (29)
| Kareem Abdul-Jabbar (22)
| Oscar Robertson (8)
| Milwaukee Arena10,746
| 4–1
|-

|- align="center" bgcolor="#ccffcc"
| 1
| April 9
| @ Los Angeles
| W 93–72
| Kareem Abdul-Jabbar (33)
| Curtis Perry (23)
| Oscar Robertson (10)
| The Forum17,505
| 1–0
|- align="center" bgcolor="#ffcccc"
| 2
| April 12
| @ Los Angeles
| L 134–135
| Kareem Abdul-Jabbar (40)
| Curtis Perry (12)
| Abdul-Jabbar, Robertson (7)
| The Forum17,505
| 1–1
|- align="center" bgcolor="#ffcccc"
| 3
| April 14
| Los Angeles
| L 105–108
| Kareem Abdul-Jabbar (33)
| Kareem Abdul-Jabbar (21)
| Abdul-Jabbar, Allen (6)
| Milwaukee Arena10,746
| 1–2
|- align="center" bgcolor="#ccffcc"
| 4
| April 16
| Los Angeles
| W 114–88
| Kareem Abdul-Jabbar (31)
| Curtis Perry (19)
| Oscar Robertson (10)
| Milwaukee Arena10,746
| 2–2
|- align="center" bgcolor="#ffcccc"
| 5
| April 18
| @ Los Angeles
| L 90–115
| Kareem Abdul-Jabbar (28)
| Kareem Abdul-Jabbar (16)
| Bob Dandridge (4)
| The Forum17,505
| 2–3
|- align="center" bgcolor="#ffcccc"
| 6
| April 22
| Los Angeles
| L 100–104
| Kareem Abdul-Jabbar (37)
| Kareem Abdul-Jabbar (25)
| Kareem Abdul-Jabbar (8)
| Milwaukee Arena10,746
| 2–4
|-

Player statistics

Season

Playoffs

Awards and honors
 Kareem Abdul-Jabbar, NBA Most Valuable Player

Transactions

Trades

References

Milwaukee
Milwaukee Bucks seasons
Milwau
Milwau